In :South Africa, the Municipal Police are the separate police forces maintained by some municipalities for law enforcement in South Africa. Municipal police forces are responsible for traffic policing and enforcing local bylaws within the municipality, and work in co-operation with the South African Police Service to prevent crime and maintain public order. Municipal police forces exist in most of the Metropolitan municipalities in South African, including Cape Town, Johannesburg, City of Tshwane, City of Ekurhuleni Metropolitan Municipality, eThekwini Metropolitan Municipality, and Nelson Mandela Bay Metropolitan Municipality.

History

Municipal policing in South Africa has a long history. The  Durban Borough Police created in 1854, later to become the  Durban City Police, and now the Durban Metro Police, to police the city of Durban: the force was headed by a Chief Constable and was modelled on British police forces.

"Municipal police forces" were also established in some cities in the 1980s, during the apartheid era. According to the Truth and Reconciliation Commission, these forces were not highly regarded, and had a reputation for "high levels of excessive and inappropriate use of violence, often arising out of drunken behaviour, ill-discipline and personal vendettas".

Legal basis

Section 206 of the Constitution of South Africa provides:

The procedure for establishing a municipal police service is laid down in the South African Police Service Amendment Act of 1998. This Act allows municipalities to apply to the government of the relevant province for permission to establish a municipal police service. The provincial Minister of Safety and Security may approve the application, after consultation with the National Commissioner of the South African Police Service, if:

The application submitted by the municipality complies with the requirements laid down in the Act.
The municipality has the resources at its disposal to provide for a MPS which complies with national policing standards on a 24-hour basis.
The establishment of a MPS will not negatively affect traffic policing.
Provision has been made for civilian supervision of the MPS.
The MPS will contribute to effective policing in that part of the province.

Jurisdiction and powers

The powers and responsibilities of South African municipal police are more restricted than those of the South African Police Service. The three statutory functions of municipal police services are:

Traffic policing
Enforcement of municipal bylaws and regulations
Preventing crime

Municipal police forces do not conduct criminal investigations. Any person arrested by the municipal police on suspicion of having committed a criminal offence must be handed over to a South African Police Service station as soon as possible.

The biggest and most visible role of municipal police forces is traffic control. In Johannesburg, the municipal police made headlines when they announced a hunt for a man who was using the social networking site Twitter to warn about police road blocks and speed traps, claiming that the man, known only as "PigSpotter", could be charged with obstructing justice.

See also

South African Police Service

Gallery

References

 

Law enforcement in South Africa
Crime in South Africa
South Africa